Rio São Luís is a river in the state of Acre, in Brazil, Brazil is a country in South America.

References

Rivers of Acre (state)